HMS Ruler was a  of the British Royal Navy during World War II. She was built in the United States as the  carrier St. Joseph (AVG/CVE/ACV-50) for Lend-Lease to the United Kingdom.

The name St. Joseph (making her the first United States Navy ship named for St. Joseph Bay, Florida) was assigned to MC hull 261, a converted C3-S-A1 cargo ship, on 23 August 1942. She was laid down on 25 March 1943 by the Seattle-Tacoma Shipbuilding Corporation of Tacoma, Washington. She was redesignated CVE-50 on 15 July, launched on 21 August 1943 and sponsored by Mrs. W.W. Smyth. The carrier was transferred to the UK on 22 December 1943 and commissioned the same day as HMS Ruler with the pennant number D72.

HMS Ruler served in the North Atlantic during 1944, protecting the vital flow of men and war materiel from the United States to Great Britain and to fighting fronts on the European continent. In early 1945, she transferred to the Pacific Theatre where she supported a raid on Truk and the campaign to take Okinawa.

From March to August 1945 was part of the British Pacific Fleet attached to the 30th Aircraft Carrier Squadron.

After the war ended, Ruler returned to the United States at Norfolk, Virginia, on 28 January 1946. She was decommissioned from RN service on 29 January, and was accepted by the US Navy the same day. In excess of the Navy’s needs, she was slated for disposal and struck from the Navy Register on 20 March 1946. The ship was sold on 13 May and scrapped within the year.

Design and description
These ships were all larger and had a greater aircraft capacity than the preceding American built escort carriers. They were also all laid down as escort carriers and not converted merchant ships.

Rulers armament comprised: two 4"/50, 5"/38 or 5"/51 Dual Purpose guns in single mounts, sixteen 40 mm Bofors anti-aircraft guns in twin mounts and twenty 20 mm Oerlikon anti-aircraft cannons in single mounts. Each ship had a maximum aircraft capacity of twenty-four aircraft which could be a mixture of Grumman Martlets, Vought F4U Corsairs or Hawker Sea Hurricane fighter aircraft and Fairey Swordfish or Grumman Avenger anti-submarine torpedo bombers.

Notes

References

External links 

 history.navy.mil: USS St. Joseph
 navsource.org: USS St. Joseph
 hazegray.org: USS St. Joseph

 

Ships built in Tacoma, Washington
1943 ships
Ruler-class escort carriers